The Institute for Healthcare Advancement (IHA) is a not-for-profit, private operating foundation providing health care and improving health literacy at the national level.  It is located in La Habra, California.

Local services
The La Habra Family Resource Center is located on the Las Lomas Elementary School grounds. It is a complete, family-centered support system, working with community resources that can address the health, emotional, social, and academic needs of children and their families.

Health literacy publications
It published easy-to-read 'What to Do For Health' books, used by the states of California and South Dakota, health plans, Head Starts, health departments, and more; these books help reduce emergency room visits and costs. 

Health Education Literacy Program (H.E.L.P.) Curriculum is an ESL (English as a Second Language) curriculum. As learners begin to master reading, writing, and speaking in English, they are also learning healthcare skills to become effective child caregivers. This project was funded through an English literacy and civics education grant from the Louisiana State Department of Education.

It has developed easy to use bilingual versions of advance health care directives in English, Spanish, Chinese, and Vietnamese; a Khmer version is being developed. It has been approved for use in California and may be downloaded for free.

Health Literacy Conference
It sponsors an annual national Health Literacy Conference for healthcare professionals and educators to teach them about health literacy, the latest research, and how to improve their patient education. It presents three awards for outstanding achievements in health literacy in the categories of Research, Innovative Programs, and Published Materials.

Annual themes
2002 Health Literacy - State of the Art
2003 Organizational Solutions
2004 Clinical and Educational Solutions
2005 Culture, Language and Clinical Issues
2006 Beyond the Written Word: Alternative Solutions
2007 Chronic Illness Management
2008 Primary Care - Best Practices and Skill Building
2009 Health Literacy - Bridging Research and Practice

References

External links
Official Institute for Healthcare Advancement website

Medical and health foundations in the United States
Health education in the United States
Organizations based in Orange County, California
La Habra, California